Eric Welsh (born 1897) was a British chemist and naval intelligence officer during the Second World War. Between 1919 and 1940 he worked for the Bergen branch of the company International Paint Ltd. From 1941 he headed the Norwegian branch of Secret Intelligence Service (SIS). Welsh is fleetingly referred to in the Norwegian television series The Heavy Water War and, based on the comments by Stephen Dorril of Welsh as a "...ladies' man who drank and smoked to excess" and a "master of dirty tricks"  alluded to as one of the models to James Bond

 
SIS operated more than one hundred intelligence operations in Norway during World War II, with about 200 agents shipped from Britain to Norway. Their principal operational goals were to gather information on German warships and ships traffic along the Norwegian coast. The normal communication channel was coded radio transmissions. 26 of the radio agents in Norway lost their lives during the war, either in combat, or after being captured by the Germans.

See also
 German nuclear weapon project
 Operation Alsos

References

1897 births
Year of death unknown
British chemists
Royal Navy officers of World War II
British expatriates in Norway
Secret Intelligence Service personnel